Vladimir Ivanovich Khotinenko (born 20 January 1952 in Slavgorod, Altai Krai, Soviet Union) is a Russian actor, film director and designer.

Biography
Born in the Altai Krai, Russian SFSR to Ivan Afanasyevich and Valentina Vasilievna Khotinenko. His father was Ukrainian, his mother came from Don Cossacks. In 1976, he received his diploma from the Institute of Architecture of Sverdlovsk, in what is now Ekaterinburg. After his military service, he was from 1978 to 1982, assistant designer at Studio-Film in Sverdlovsk, and was assistant director for the film by Nikita Mikhalkov, A Few Days from the Life of I. I. Oblomov. He collaborated on other films by Mikhalkov in Moscow, such as Five Nights (Пять вечеров) 1979, and Family Relations (Родня) 1981.

He then became director of the Gerasimov Institute of Cinematography in Moscow. His 1999 film Strastnoy Boulevard was entered into the 21st Moscow International Film Festival where it won a Special Mention.

He excelled in historical films and large scenes, particularly describing the history of Russia. He won the Golden Eagle in 2004 for 72 Metres.

In March 2014 he signed a letter in support of Vladimir Putin's policies regarding the 2014 Russian annexation of Crimea and Ukraine.

Filmography
Actor:
1981 Family Relations  
1982 Kazachya zastava  
1988 The Soloist
1994 A Plane Flies in Russia
2005 The Fall of the Empire (TV)

Director:
1984 Alone and Unarmed
1987 Mirror for a Hero
1990 The Swarm
1992 Patriotic Comedy
1993 Makarov
1995 A Moslem
1999 Strastnoy bulvar (producer)
2002 Po tu storonu volkov
2003 Sledstvie vedut znatoki 23: Treteyskiy sudiya
2004 72 Meters
2004 The Fall of the Empire (screenwriter)
2007 1612
2009 The Priest
2011 Dostoyevsky (TV series)
2014 Demons
2019 The Lenin Factor

References

External links

 
1952 births
Living people
People from Slavgorod
Russian designers
High Courses for Scriptwriters and Film Directors alumni
Russian film directors
Soviet male film actors
Soviet film directors
People's Artists of Russia
20th-century Russian male actors
Academicians of the Russian Academy of Cinema Arts and Sciences "Nika"
Russian people of Ukrainian descent
Russian male film actors